Heavy Gear Fighter is a stand-alone two-player card game set in the Heavy Gear universe. It was published by Canadian game publisher Dream Pod 9 in 1994. The game is currently out of print.

Game Description

Heavy Gear Fighter is a card-based dueling game in which two Heavy Gears fight it out in the Badlands. It is not a collectible card game -- everything needed to play is contained in the box. 

Every playing card is illustrated with a full color picture of a Gear. They are divided into Attacks of various strengths, Defenses, and Special Effects. Both players draw from the same pile. 

The game does not use dice or paper. Each playable Gear has a full color record/action sheet that is used to keep track of actions/damage with small counters. Cards are dealt from a player's hand to cause damage, defend against enemy attacks, and create various special effects.

Expansion sets

The game received an official expansion set, Equipment & Weapons, in 1995. As its name implies, it added new Equipment and Weapon cards that could be played on the Gears. 

Several "mini-sets" were included as promotional material in the pages of various magazines, notably Mecha Press and White Wolf Magazine. These cards were always optional and allowed players to create special combat conditions as well as execute different maneuvers. 

A set was designed that would have featured new vehicles (notably tanks and Striders), but it was never published.

Reception
Scott Haring reviewed Heavy Gear Fighter in Pyramid #14 (August, 1995), and stated that "Heavy Gear Fighter: Showdown in the Badlands is a quick, colorful, tactical card game of mecha combat. The mecha in Heavy Gear aren't the titanic walking beasts of BattleTech or other games; they're a little smaller (a mere 15 feet or so tall), and have a terrific, lithe athletic look that the larger walking gun emplacements don't have."

Reviews
White Wolf Inphobia #52 (February 1995)

References

External links
Dream Pod 9's Website

Card games introduced in 1994
Dedicated deck card games
Heavy Gear